Jeon Kwang-jin (Hangul: 전광진; Hanja: 全光眞; born 30 June 1981) is a South Korean footballer. He played for Seongnam Ilhwa Chunma, Gwangju Sangmu Bulsajo and Chinese Super League side Dalian Shide.

Cheon transferred to Dalian Shide in January 2011 but was released in July for his involvement in the 2011 South Korean football match-fixing scandal.

Club career statistics

References

External links 

1981 births
Living people
South Korean footballers
South Korean expatriate footballers
K League 1 players
Chinese Super League players
Seongnam FC players
Gimcheon Sangmu FC players
Dalian Shide F.C. players
Jeon Kwang-jin
Expatriate footballers in China
South Korean expatriate sportspeople in China
Expatriate footballers in Thailand
South Korean expatriate sportspeople in Thailand
Myongji University alumni
Association football midfielders